Roger Merrett (born 19 April 1960) is a former Australian rules footballer who played in two Victorian Football League premiership sides with the Essendon Football Club in the mid-1980s before moving to the fledgling Brisbane Bears, later captaining the new club for seven seasons. He ended his career as the games record holder for the Brisbane Bears, in addition to being the last VFL/AFL player from the 1970s to retire from professional football.

Playing career

Essendon
Merrett was a strong competitor for the Essendon Football Club during his playing career from 1978 to 1987 for a total of 149 games and kicked a total of 148 goals. Merrett also was a member of Essendon's premiership teams in 1984 and 1985.

Brisbane Bears
He moved to the Brisbane Bears in 1988 as captain. Merrett became a strong and inspirational captain of the Bears, at first alternating in the ruck with Mark Mickan.  After John Hutton's inconsistent form at full-forward reached an end, Merrett's tired legs were moved permanently to the position where he was able to use his height and kicking abilities to spearhead the club as their leading goalkicker for many seasons before Alastair Lynch proved a suitable replacement. Merrett retired from his playing career at the end of the 1996 season.

Merrett played a total of 164 games and kicked a total of 285 goals for Brisbane Bears from 1988 until 1996. 

He played on for many years, earning the nickname Roger the Dodger (with reference to his age) before his eventual retirement.

Coaching career

Brisbane Lions
Merrett held coaching ambitions for much of his career, and after his retirement from his playing career at the end of the 1996 season, he was immediately recruited by his senior coach John Northey to fill an assistant coaching role at the Brisbane Lions (formed on 1 November 1996 from a merger between the Brisbane Bears and the Fitzroy Football Club).  However, relations between the two men were cool, and half-way through the 1998 season, with the Lions at the bottom of the ladder, Northey was sacked as senior coach and Merrett was appointed caretaker senior coach of Brisbane Lions for the rest of the 1998 season. Merrett then led Brisbane Lions to three wins, one draw and seven losses of the remaining eleven games in the 1998 season to still finish in last place on the ladder, which was the sixteenth position for the wooden spoon. At the end of the 1998 season, Merrett was however not retained as Brisbane Lions senior coach. The senior coaching position instead went to Australian football legend Leigh Matthews.  Merrett has not been closely involved in football since, outside of occasional club functions at Brisbane and Essendon.

Life after football
Merrett now lives on the Gold Coast, Queensland, where he operates a post office.  He also provides special comments for ABC Radio broadcasts of Brisbane Lions home matches.

The Brisbane Lions' award for their best-and-fairest player over a season, the Merrett-Murray Medal, is part-named after him.

For 2009 AFLQ season, Merrett was part-time assistant coach for AFLQ power house, Southport Sharks.

On 18 January 2011, Merrett suffered a stroke, thought to be related to a hereditary heart condition.

In 2016, he joined the Bond University Bullsharks in a volunteer capacity and to assist his son Ben who took on the reserves coaching job.

References 

1977 Victorian under 17 - Australian premiers

1960 births
Living people
Brisbane Lions coaches
Brisbane Bears players
Essendon Football Club players
Essendon Football Club Premiership players
All-Australians (1953–1988)
People from Queensland
Australian rules footballers from Victoria (Australia)
Victorian State of Origin players
Two-time VFL/AFL Premiership players